Dahlberg may refer to:

 Dahlberg (surname), including a list of people with the name
 Dahlberg Arena, in Missoula, Montana, U.S.
 Dahlberg Electronics, now Miracle-Ear

See also

 Dalberg (disambiguation)
 Thymophylla tenuiloba, the Dahlberg daisy
 Dahlberg Borer Newcomer syndrome, a rare genetic condition